The United Kingdom of Great Britain and Northern Ireland, commonly known as the United Kingdom (UK or U.K.) or Britain, is a sovereign country located off the northwestern coast of the European mainland. It includes the island of Great Britain, the northeastern part of the island of Ireland, and many smaller islands. The United Kingdom consists of four constituent countries: England, Scotland, Wales and Northern Ireland.

The United Kingdom is a highly developed country with a market-orientated economy and is a member of the Group of 7 (formerly G8) leading industrialised countries. It is the sixth-largest national economy in the world measured by nominal gross domestic product (GDP), ninth-largest by purchasing power parity (PPP) and twenty first-largest by GDP per capita. In 2017, the UK was the eleventh-largest goods exporter in the world and the eighth-largest goods importer. It also had the second-largest inward foreign direct investment, and the third-largest outward foreign direct investment. 
The UK left the European Union in 2019, but it remains the UK's largest trading partner. In 2019, the UK had a labour force of 34,280,575 people and, as of 2018, an employment rate of 78.7%.

The service sector contributes around 80% of GDP with the financial services industry being significant, with London as the second-largest financial centre in the world. Britain's aerospace industry is the second-largest national aerospace industry. Its pharmaceutical industry is the tenth-largest in the world.  Of the world's 500 largest companies, 26 are headquartered in the UK. The economy is boosted by North Sea oil and gas production; its reserves were estimated at 2.8 billion barrels in 2016, although it has been a net importer of oil since 2005.  The size of London's economy makes it the largest city by GDP in Europe.

In the 18th century the UK was the first country to industrialise, and during the 19th century it had a dominant role in the global economy, accounting for 9.1% of the world's GDP in 1870. The Second Industrial Revolution was also taking place rapidly in the United States and the German Empire; this presented an increasing economic challenge for the UK. The costs of fighting World War I and World War II further weakened the UK's relative position. In the 21st century, the UK has faced the challenges of the 2008 banking collapse and the 2020 coronavirus pandemic.

Largest companies
This list shows the UK companies in the Fortune Global 500, which ranks firms by total revenues reported as of September 2019. Only the top five firms are included as a sample.

Notable companies
This is a list of companies of the United Kingdom as well as those first established in the United Kingdom that are no longer British owned, and also including defunct UK companies. Only companies with articles in Wikipedia are included.

K
Kaos Films — is a film production company. It formerly held film competitions. It was established in 2001.
Keen City — is a film and television production company. Established in 2008, its headquarters is in London.
Kelda Group — is a utility company (water and sewage). Established in 1989, its headquarters is in Bradford, Yorkshire. Its subsidiaries are Yorkshire Water and Kelda Water Services.
Kenley Water Company — was a utility company (water supply) until 1885. In 1885 it merged with Caterham Springwater Company to form the East Surrey Water Company.
Kindle Entertainment — is a television production company. Established in 2007, its headquarters is in London.
Kingfisher plc - is a multinational retail company with brands including B&Q, Castorama, Brico Dépôt and Screwfix. It was established in 1982 as Paternoster Stores in order to buyout the British Woolworths chain after which it became Woolworth Holdings. After the divestment of Woolworths, in 1989 it became Kingfisher plc. Headquartered in London, its 2020 revenue was £12.3 billion, with a net income of £592 million.

L
Ladbrokes Coral — is a gambling company. Established in 1886 in Warwickshire, its headquarters is in London. It was previously known as Ladbrokes, and as Hilton Group plc when it owned Hilton hotels and branding outside of the United States. In 2016 it acquired Gala Coral Group and became Ladbrokes Coral. Its parent company is GVC Holdings.
Lagonda — is a manufacturing company (luxury automobiles). Established in 1906, its headquarters is in Staines-upon-Thames, Middlesex. It also produced shells, guns and other weapons during WWI, and WWII. In 1947 it was bought by Aston Martin.
Lambeth Waterworks Company — was a utility company (water) from 1785 to 1903. Headquartered in London, it became part of the Metropolitan Water Board.
Lambton Collieries — was a coal mining company from 1896 to 1947. Headquartered in County Durham, it became part of the National Coal Board.
Land Securities Group plc (Landsec) — is a commercial property development and investment company. Established in 1944, its headquarters is in London. In 2019 its revenue was £748 million, with net income of £119 million.
Laurence Olivier Productions — is a stage and film production company established in the 1950s.
Layton Sports Cars — see TVR.
Leatherhead and District Water — was a utility company (water supply) from 1883 to 1927. It became part of East Surrey Water Company.
Lees Foods Limited - also known as Lees of Scotland is a manufacturer of confectionery and cakes. It was established in 1931 in Coatbridge, Scotland by John Justice Lees and is still headquartered there. In 1982 Lees established Heather Cameron Foods to produce meringues, later merging it into the Lees brand. In 1987 Lees acquired Gainsborough Chocolates and Fullers of Greenoch. In 1991 Lees was acquired by Northumbrian Fine Foods before returning to independent Scottish ownership in 1993.
Left Bank Pictures — is a film and television production company. Established in 2007, its headquarters is in London. Its parent company is Sony Pictures Entertainment.
Legal & General Group plc - is a British multinational financial services and asset management company. It offers investment management, mortgages, pensions, annuities, and life assurance. It also offered general insurance before the sale of Legal & General Insurance to Allianz Insurance in 2020. Established in 1836 in London as The New Law Life Assurance Society it was later renamed as Legal & General. Still headquartered in London, it has total assets of £570.5 billion as of 2020. Its total revenue in 2020 was £50.2 billion, with a net income of £1.2 billion.
Lex Records — is a record label company. Established in 2001, its headquarters is in Camden, London. It was originally an imprint of Warp Records.
The Light Cinemas — is a cinema chain company established in 2007.
Lightning Car Company — is a sports car development company. Established in 2007 in Fulham and Peterborough, its headquarters is in Coventry.
Limpsfield and Oxted Water Company — was a utility company (water supply) from 1888 to 1930.
Lionsgate UK — is a film production and distribution company. Established in 1997, it was formerly Redbus Film Distribution, and Helkon SK. It is now is a subsidiary of Lionsgate.
Lister Motor Company — is a manufacturing company (sports cars). Established in 1954 in  Cambridge, it was formerly known as George Lister Engineering Limited.
Liverpool Hydraulic Power Company — was an energy company (hydraulic power generation and supply) from 1888 to 1971. It was located in Liverpool.
LLM Communications — was a political lobbying company. Established in 1997, it is now defunct.
Lloyds Banking Group — is a financial services company (banking, life assurance, and pensions). Established in 1995, its headquarters are in Edinburgh, Scotland, and London. It was formed by the merger of Lloyds Bank with TSB. In 2019 its revenue was £42.3 billion, with net income of £2.9 billion.
London Clubs International — is a gaming and hospitality company. Established in 1981, its headquarters is in London. It is owned by Caesars Entertainment.
London Electricity Board — was a state owned energy company (electricity supply and distribution, electrical appliances retailer) from 1948 to 1998. Headquartered in London, it was also known as LEB, and London Electricity plc. In 1998 it was acquired by Électricité de France.
London Films — is a film and television production company, established in 1932.
London Hydraulic Power Company — was an energy company (hydraulic power generation and supply) from 1883 to 1977. It was located in London.
Lonmin — is a mining company (platinum group metals). Established in 1909 as the London and Rhodesian Mining and Land Company, it was later known as Lonrho when it briefly owned several UK newspapers. Its headquarters is in London.
Lotus Cars — is a manufacturing company (sports and racing cars, and engineering development). Established in 1948 in Hornsey, London, its headquarters is in Hethel, Norfolk. It was formerly known as Lotus Engineering Limited. It has become Group Lotus PLC divided into Lotus Cars and Lotus Engineering.
Love Productions — is a television production company. Established in 2004, its headquarters is in London. Its owner is Sky Group.
Lowestoft Water Company — was a utility company (water supply, formerly also a gas supplier) from 1853 to 1962. It was formerly known as the Lowestoft Gas, Water and Market Company. In 1962 it merged with the Great Yarmouth Waterworks Company to form the East Anglian Water Company.
Lucky Me — is a record label and design studio company. Established in 2007, its headquarters is in Glasgow, Scotland.
Ludger Limited — is a biotechnology company (glycoprofiling technology). Established in 1999, its headquarters is in Oxford.
Lush - is a private company producing and retailing cosmetics. It specialises in vegan and vegetarian creams, soaps, shampoos, shower gels, lotions and other cosmetics. Established in 1995, its headquarters is in Poole, Dorset. It has over 900 stores in the UK, US, Canada, Australia and other countries.
Luther Pendragon — is a public relations company. Established in 1992, its headquarters is in London.

M
M&Co. (company name is Mackay's Stores) – is a clothing and homeware retail company. Established in 1834 by Len McGeoch as a pawnbrokers in Paisley, Renfrewshire Scotland, it converted to a clothing retailer from 1953. Now headquartered in Inchinnan, Scotland, it has over 300 stores including overseas. In 2019 its revenue was £193 million, with a net income of £0.88 million.
Mackies of Scotland – is a private food manufacturing company specialising in ice cream, potato crisps, and chocolate confectionery. Founded in 1912 as a dairy farm, the milk retail business was divested in 1997. Ice cream production began in 1986, crisps in 2009, and chocolate in 2014. It is headquartered in Rothienorman, Scotland. In 2018 its revenue was £13.9 million, with an operating income of £1.3 million.
Magic Light Pictures — film and television production company. Established in 2003, its headquarters is in London.
Magma Pictures — film production company. Established in 2004, its headquarters is in London.
Manchester Collieries — coal mining company, 1929–1947. Headquartered in Walkden, it was formed by the merger of a number of independent mining companies. It was nationalised in 1947.
Manchester Hydraulic Power — energy company (hydraulic power generation and supply), 1894–1972. It was headquartered in Manchester.
Mancunian Films — film production company, 1934–1954. It was formerly known as Blakeley's Productions.
MANWEB (Merseyside and North Wales Electricity Board) — energy company (electricity supply and distribution). Established in 1947, it is now part of SP Energy Networks.
Marconi Electronic Systems — defence systems (naval vessels, radio, radar, munitions, spacecraft, avionics), 1897–1999. Headquartered in Chelmsford, Essex, it was formerly known as Marconi Company, and GEC-Marconi when the General Electric Company became its parent company in 1968. In 1999 it was merged with British Aerospace to form BAE Systems.
Marella Cruises — transport company (cruise line). Established in 1973, it was formerly known as Thomson Cruises. Its parent company is TUI AG.
Marks & Spencer Group plc - is a British multinational retail company offering clothing, home products, food, and energy. It was established in 1884 in Leeds by Michael Marks and Thomas Spencer. Now headquartered in London, its total revenue for 2020 was £10.1 billion with a net income of £27.4 million.
Marlin Sportscars — manufacturing company (sports cars). Established in 1979 in Plymouth, Devon, its headquarters is in Crediton, Devon.
Marylebone Studios — film production company. Established in the late 1930s, its headquarters was in London.
Marv Films — film production company. Established in 2004, its headquarters is in London.
Mayflower Productions — film production company, 1937–1954. It was formerly known as Mayflower Pictures.
Mecca Bingo — gambling company (bingo clubs, and online gambling). Established in 1961, its headquarters is in Maidenhead. Formerly known as Top Rank, its parent company is The Rank Group.
Mecca Leisure Group — leisure and hospitality company (nightclubs, cafes, casinos, hotels, theme parks). Established in 1933 as Mecca Agency Ltd, its headquarters is in London. In 1990 it became part of The Rank Group.
Medherant — is a pharmaceuticals company that manufactures transdermal patches. Established in 2015, its headquarters is in Coventry. 
Melrose Industries - is a manufacturing company that invests in and divests engineering companies. Established in 2003, its headquarters is in London. Its main subsidiaries are Brush Turbogenerators, GKN, and Nortek. In 2020 its revenue was £8.7 billion, with a net income of £533million.
Merchant Ivory Productions — film production company, established in 1961.
Merton Park Studios - film production and studio company, 1930–1967.
Merlin Cinemas — cinema chain company. Established in 1990, its headquarters is in England.
Metropolitan Water Board — state owned utility company (water supply and sewage), 1903–1974. Formed from nine private water companies, it became part of Thames Water.
MG Car Company — manufacturing company, (sports and racing cars), 1930–2010. MG Cars were first produced in 1924, at Oxford.
MG Motor — manufacturing company (sports and racing cars). Established in 2006, its headquarters is in Longbridge, Birmingham. Its parent company is SAIC Motor.
MGM British Studios — film production company, 1936–1970. It was a subsidiary of MGM.
MGM-EMI — film production, and distribution company. See EMI Films.
MHP Communications — public relations company. Established in 2010, its headquarters is in London.
The Mill — film  company (visual effects, and creative content). Established in 1990, its headquarters is in London. It is owned by Technicolor SA.
Minera Mining Company — lead mining company, 1845–1914. It was located in Minera, Wales.
Minera Lime Company — mining company (lime quarries and kilns), 1852–1972. It was located in Minera, Wales,
Minerals Separation, Limited — mining company (ore extraction processes), c1903-c1950s. It was headquartered in London.
Mirisch Films — film and television production company, 1962–1982. It was a subsidiary of The Mirisch Company.
Mo-Car Syndicate — manufacturing company (automobiles), 1895–1905. Headquartered in Glasgow, Scotland, it later became Arrol-Johnston.
The Mob — television and commercials production company.
Modern Life? — film production company. Established in 1993, it was formerly known as For This Is Film, and as Underground Productions.
Mofilm — advertising company. Established in 2007, its headquarters is in London.
Mond Nickel Company — mining company, 1900–1929. It was merged with the International Nickel Company.
Morgan Motor Company — manufacturing company (luxury cars). Established in 1910, its headquarters is in Malvern, Worcestershire.
Morrisons - Wm Morrison Supermarkets plc, trading as Morrisons, is a supermarket chain. Founded in 1899 by William Morrison, its headquarters is in Bradford. Its 2020 revenue was £17.5 billion, with a net income of £348 million. In October 2021 it was confirmed that the company had been acquired by US private equity company Clayton, Dubilier & Rice.
Moss Bay Hematite Iron and Steel Company — metals and mining company,  1876–1909. Headquartered in Workington, Cumberland, in 1909 it was amalgamated into Workington Iron and Steel Company.
Movie House Cinemas — cinema chain company, headquartered in Belfast, Northern Ireland.
Moving Picture Company — film company (visual effects). Established in 1970, its headquarters in London. Its parent company is Technicolor SA.
Mr Q Media — film company (post-production services). See Suited Caribou Media.
Mr Films — film company (studios and film production), 1973–1991. It was headquartered in London.
Multitude Media — public relations company. Established in 2009, its headquarters is in London.
My Local Bobby — security company. Established in 2016, its headquarters is in London.

N
Napoleon Films - film production company. See G.B. Samuelson Productions.
National Commercial Bank of Scotland — financial services company (banking), 1959–1969. It was formed by a merger of the National Bank of Scotland with the Commercial Bank of Scotland. In 1969 it was merged with the Royal Bank of Scotland to form the National and Commercial Banking Group, which was later renamed the Royal Bank of Scotland Group and then NatWest Group.
National Grid plc — energy company (multinational electricity and gas transmission company). Established in 1990, its headquarters is in London. Formerly known as National Grid Transco, its predecessor was the Central Electricity Generating Board. In 2019 its revenue was £14.9 billion, with net income of £1.5 billion.
National Interest Picture Productions — film production company, 1925–1978. Headquartered in London, it was formerly known as Publicity Pictures.
National Power — energy company (gas and electricity), 1990–2001. Headquartered in London, it was formerly part of the Central Electricity Generating Board. In 2000, it was demerged into Innogy plc and International Power.
Natural Nylon — film and theatre production company, 1997–2003.
NatWest (National Westminster Bank plc) — financial services company (banking and insurance). Established in 1968, its headquarters is in Bishopsgate, London. It was formed from the merger of National Provincial Bank with Westminster Bank. Its parent company is NatWest Holdings, the "ring-fenced" business of NatWest Group.
NatWest Holdings Limited — retail banking holding company (it includes NatWest, Royal Bank of Scotland, Ulster Bank and Coutts). Established in 2016, its headquarters is in London. Its parent company is the NatWest Group.
NatWest Group — financial services holding company (banking and insurance). Its subsidiaries include: NatWest, Royal Bank of Scotland, Ulster Bank, NatWest Markets and Coutts. Established in 1969, its headquarters is in Edinburgh, Scotland. It was formed from the merger of the National Commercial Bank of Scotland with the Royal Bank of Scotland. It was formerly known as National and Commercial Banking Group and later as the Royal Bank of Scotland Group. In 2019, its revenue was £14.2 billion, with a net income of £3.8 billion.
NatWest Markets plc — financial services company (investment banking). Established in 2016, its headquarters is in Bishopsgate, London. Its parent company is the NatWest Group.
Neal Street Productions — film, television and theatre production company, established in 2003.
Nelsons — alternative medicines production company  (homeopathic medicines, complementary medicines, natural medicines). Established in 1866, its headquarters is in Wimbledon, London. It was formerly known as Ambrecht, Nelson & Co, and as A. Nelson & Co.
NetResult — IT services company based in Mold.
NewDay Limited — financial services company (credit products). Established in 2000, its headquarters is in Kings Cross, London. It was formerly known as SAV Credit.
New Moon — film production company. Established in 1996, its headquarters is in London.
New River Company — utility company (water supply), landowner and residential development, 1619–1904. It became part of the Metropolitan Water Board in 1904.
Newton, Chambers & Co. — mining and manufacturing company (coal and ironstone mining, iron production, industrial construction, disinfectant, production of army vehicles such as the Churchill tank during WWII, construction equipment, wax polishes and wood stains, oil central heating) 1789–2001.
N. Hingley & Sons — mining and manufacturing company (cable chains, anchors, coal mining, iron works), 1838–1986. It was established in Cradley, West Midlands.
Night Slugs — record label company. Established in 2010, its headquarters is in London.
Nisa Retail Limited — retail and wholesale co-operative company (groceries). Established in 1977, its headquarters is in Scunthorpe, North Lincolnshire. Its parent company is The Co-operative Group.
Nexus Studios — is a film production company. Established in 2000, its headquarters is in London.
Noble Foods - is a limited company producing poultry products and desserts. It is the United Kingdom's largest egg producer. It was founded in 2006 by the merger of Deans Foods with Stonegate which was later divested. Headquartered in Standlake, Oxfordshire, it owns the dessert manufacturer Gü as a subsidiary.
Norbrook Group — is a pharmaceuticals company (veterinary medicines). Established in 1969, its headquarters is in Newry, Northern Ireland.
North Eastern Gas Board — state owned energy supplier (gas supplier), 1949–1973. It became part of British Gas.
North of Scotland Hydro-Electric Board — energy company (electricity generator and supplier), 1943–1990. Headquartered in Edinburgh, Scotland, it was succeeded by Scottish Hydro Electric.
North Thames Gas Board — state owned energy company (gas), 1949–1972. It became part of the British Gas Corporation.
North Western Gas Board — state owned energy company (gas supply), 1949–1973. In 1973 it became part of British Gas.
Northern Coachbuilders (NCB) — manufacturing company (automobiles). See Smith Electric Vehicles.
Northern Electric — energy company (electricity supply and distribution), 1947–1996. Headquartered in Newcastle upon Tyne, it was formerly the North Eastern Electricity Board. In 1996 it was acquired by CalEnergy.
Northern Gas Networks — energy company (gas supply and distribution). Established in 2005, its headquarters is in Leeds, Yorkshire.
Northern Ireland Electricity Networks — energy company (electricity transmission and distribution). Established in 1973, it was formerly the Northern Ireland Electricity Service. Its parent company is ESB Group.
Northern Ireland Water — state owned utility company (water supply and sewage). Established in 2007, it was formerly the Northern Ireland Water Service.
Northern Powergrid — energy company (electricity distribution). Established in 1996, its headquarters is in Newcastle upon Tyne. It was formerly CE Electric UK Funding Company. Its parent company is Berkshire Hathaway Energy.
Northern Rock — financial services company (banking; formerly it was a building society), 1965–2012. Headquartered in Gosforth, Newcastle upon Tyne, it was formed by the merger of the Northern Counties Permanent Building Society with the Rock Building Society. It was nationalised in 2008, and in 2010 it was mainly subsumed by Virgin Money UK plc with the exception of the high risk mortgage book which was renamed Northern Rock (Asset Management) and remained nationalised until 2016 when it was sold to Cerberus Capital Management.
Northumbrian Water — utility company (water supply and sewage). Established in 1989, its headquarters is in Durham. It was preceded by the Northumbrian Water Authority. Its parent company is Northumbrian Water Group.
Northumbrian Water Group — holding company for several water utility companies including Northumbrian Water and Essex and Suffolk Water. Established in 1989, its headquarters is in Durham. In 2011 it was acquired by CK Infrastructure Holdings.
NORWEB — energy company (electricity supply and distribution), 1948–1995. It was formerly the North Western Electricity Board. In 1995 it was acquired by North West Water and became part of North West Electricity Networks.
Nottingham Building Society — building society (banking and other financial services). Established in 1849, its headquarters is in Nottingham, Nottinghamshire.
Nottingham Corporation Gas Department — state owned power company (production and supply of coal gas), 1874–1947. Headquartered in Nottingham, it was preceded by Nottingham Gas Light and Coke Company. In 1947 it became part of the East Midlands Gas Board.
Npower — energy company (electricity generator and supplier). Established in 2000, its headquarters is in Swindon, Wiltshire. It was formerly known as Innogy plc, and RWE npower. Its parent company is Innogy.
Nuclear Electric — energy company (nuclear power generation), 1990–1995. Headquartered in London, it was formerly part of the Central Electricity Generating Board. In 1995 it became part of British Energy.
Number 9 Films — film production company. Established in 2002, its headquarters is in London.

O
Oakhurst Productions — film production company, late 1960s—1970.
Odeon Cinemas — cinema chain company. Established in 1928, its headquarters is in Brierley Hill, Staffordshire.
Odyssey Entertainment — film company (finance and distribution), 2001–2009. It is headquartered in London.
Ogle Design — design consultancy company (former automobile manufacturer). Established in 1954, its headquarters is in Letchworth, Hertfordshire.
OnePoll — market research company. Established in 2002, its headquarters is in London.
OpenBet — gambling company (software). Established in 1996, its headquarters is in Chiswick, London. It is owned by Scientific Games Corporation.
Optilan — communications and security company. Established in 1990, its headquarters is in Coventry.
Opus Energy — energy company (gas and electricity supplier). Established in 2002, its headquarters is in Northampton. Formerly known as Oxford Power Holdings, since 2017 it is part of the Drax Group.
OVO Energy — energy company (electricity and gas supplier and home telecommunications). Established in 2009, its headquarters is in Bristol.
The Oxford Artisan Distillery — distillery company. Established in 2017, its headquarters is in Oxford.
Oxford BioMedica — pharmaceuticals company (gene-based medicines). Established in 1995, its headquarters is in Oxford.
Oxford Scientific Films — television and film production company. Established in 1968, its headquarters is in Oxford.
Oxitec — biotechnology company (genetically modified insect production for insect/disease control). Established in 2002, its headquarters is in Oxford.

P
PD Ports — is a ports, shipping, and logistics company (formerly coal mining and engineering). It is the owner of Teesport, and ports at Hartlepool, Howden and Keadby; with additional operations at the Port of Felixstowe, Port of Immingham, and Port of Hull. Established in 1840, its headquarters is in Middlesbrough. It was formerly known as Powell Duffryn. Since 2009 it is owned by Brookfield Asset Management.
Panorama Antennas — is a manufacturing company (communications antennas and closely related diplexer products). Established in 1947, its headquarters is in London. It was formerly known as J.F.J. Products.
Partridge Films (aka Partridge Productions) — is a television and film production company. Established in 1974, its headquarters is in Bristol.
Passion Pictures — is a film production company. Established in 1987, its headquarters is in London.
Pennon Group — is a utility company (water supply and sewage, waste management). Established in 1989, its headquarters is in Exeter, Devon. Its subsidiaries include South West Water and Viridor. In 2019 its revenue was £1.4 billion, with net income of £222 million.
The People's Operator (TPO Mobile) — was a telecommunications company (mobile virtual network operator) from 2012 to 2019. It was headquartered in London.
Percy Main Productions — is the former name of Scott Free Productions a film and television production company.
Pfizer UK — is a pharmaceuticals company. Established in 1952, its headquarters is in Tadworth, Surrey. It is a subsidiary of Pfizer.
Phoenix Natural Gas — is an energy company (gas supplier). Established in 1996, its headquarters is in Belfast, Northern Ireland. It was formerly part of British Gas.
Phones 4u — was a telecommunications company (mobile phone retailer) from 1987 to 2014. Headquartered in Newcastle-under-Lyme, Staffordshire, it was formerly known as Midlands Mobile Sales.
Photoplay Productions — is a film company (production, and restoration), established in 1990.
Picturehouse Cinemas — is a cinema chain, and film distribution company. Established in 1989, its headquarters is in London.
Pinball London — is a film production company. Established in 2009, its headquarters is in London.
Pinewood Group — is a film and television studios company. Established in 2001, its headquarters is in Iver Heath, Buckinghamshire.
Pinewood Studios — is a film and television studios. Established in 1936, it is located at Iver Heath, Buckinghamshire.
Platform Home Loans — is a financial services company (mortgages). Established in 1989 as part of Bear Stearns Home Loans, in 2009 it became part of The Co-operative Group.
Platform Post-production — is a film and television post production company. Established in 2001, its headquarters is in London.
Poison Pen Films — is a film production company, headquartered in Leeds.
PolyGram Filmed Entertainment — was a film production company from 1980 to 2000. It was formerly known as PolyGram Films, PolyGram Pictures, and as PFE.
Porcelain Film — is a film and television production company. Established in 2004, its headquarters is in London.
Porterbrook Leasing Company Ltd — is a railway company (leasing of rolling stock and associated equipment). Established in 1994, it was formed as part of the privatisation of British Rail.
Portland Communications — is a communications company (political consultancy, and public relations). Established in 2001, its headquarters is in London.
Portobello Post — is a film company (video and film post production), headquartered in London.
Portsmouth Water — is a utility company (water supply). Established in 1857, its headquarters is in Portsmouth, Hampshire.
Powell and Pressburger — was a film production company from 1939 to 1957. It was also known as The Archers, and as Archers Film Productions.
Powell Duffryn — is the former name of PD Ports, a sea ports company.
Premier Foods – is a food manufacturing public company that owns brands such as Mr Kipling, Ambrosia, Bird's Custard, Angel Delight, Oxo, Bisto, Batchelors and also produces Cadbury cakes under license. It was founded in 1975 as Hillsdown Holdings by Harry Solomon and David Thompson. First located in London, it is now headquartered in St. Albans, Hertfordshire. In 2020 its revenue was £847 million, with a net income of £46.5 million.
Premier Inn — is a hospitality company (hotel chain). Established in 1987, its headquarters is in Dunstable, Bedfordshire. It was formerly known as Travel Inn. Its parent company is Whitbread.
Primerdesign — is a biotechnology company (products for quantitative real-time polymerase chain reaction). Established in 2005, its headquarters is in Southampton.
Prudential plc — is a multinational financial services company (life assurance, pensions and investment). Established in 1848, its headquarters is in London. It owns Prudential Corporation Asia, and Jackson National Life. In 2019, its revenue was £93.7 billion, with total income of £792 million.
Publicity Pictures — was a film production company from 1925 to 1945. It was headquartered in London.

Q
QA — Digital education and skills provider (Virtual and classroom training, higher education, apprenticeships and talent solutions). Established in 1983, its headquarters is in London.
Quantum Pharmaceutical — pharmaceuticals company (unlicensed medicines, special obtain products). Established in 2004, its headquarters is in Burnopfield, County Durham.
Quantum Sports Cars — manufacturing company (sports cars). Established in 1967, its headquarters is in Devon.
Quick Off The Mark Productions — film and television production company, 2009–2016. It was headquartered in Glasgow, Scotland.
Qwerty Films —film production company, established in 1999.

R
Radical Sportscars - manufacturing company (racing cars, motorsport). Established in 1997, its headquarters is in Peterborough.
Randox Laboratories — biotechnology company (in-vitro diagnostic reagents, and equipment for laboratory medicine). Established in 1982, its headquarters is in Crumlin, County Antrim, Northern Ireland.
The Rank Group — gambling company (casinos, bingo, online gambling). It was formerly also operating as a film producer, cinema chain, engineering and leisure company. Established in 1995, its headquarters is in Maidenhead. In 2019 its revenue was £695.1 million, with net income of £27.6 million.
The Rank Organisation — entertainment company (film production and distribution, cinema chain, electrical manufacturer), 1937–1996. It was headquartered in London.
Reckitt — multinational consumer goods company. Established in 1999 by the merger of British company Reckitt & Colman plc and Dutch company Benckiser N.V, its headquarters is in Slough, England.
Recorded Picture Company — film production company. Established in 1974, its headquarters is in London.
Redbus Film Distribution — film production and distribution company. See Lionsgate UK.
Reeltime Pictures — film and television production company, established in 1984.
Reel Cinemas — cinema chain company. Established in 2001, it was formerly known as Curzon.
Regal Cinemas — cinema chain company.
Reigate Waterworks Company — utility company (water supply), 1859–1896. It became part of East Surrey Water Company.
Remus Films — film production company, 1954–1958.
ReNeuron — biotechnology company (stem cell therapies). Established in 1997, its headquarters is in Surrey.
Retrogenix — biotechnology company (human cell microarray screening services). Established in 2008, its headquarters is in Sheffield.
RHA Technologies Ltd. - Consumer electronics company (audio products). Established in 2008, its headquarters is in Glasgow, Scotland.
Richard Evans and Company — mining company (coal), 1730–1899
Richwater Films — film production and distribution company, 2013–2016. It was headquartered in London.
Rio Tinto — mining company (Anglo–Australian multinational metals and mining corporation). Established in 1873, its headquarters are in London, UK and Melbourne, Australia. In 2019 its revenue was £43.1 billion, with net income of £6.9 billion.
Riversimple — manufacturing company (automobiles). Established in Ludlow, its headquarters is in Llandrindod Wells, Wales.
RJB Mining — mining company (coal). See UK Coal.
Robin Hood Energy — state owned non-profit energy supplier (gas and electricity). Established in 2015, its headquarters is in Nottingham. It is owned by Nottingham City Council.
Rocket Pictures — film and television production company. Established in 1996, its headquarters is in London.
Rogue Films — film and television production company. Established in 1974, its headquarters is in London. It was formerly known as Drum Films.
Rolls-Royce Holdings — holding company that owns Rolls-Royce, a British multinational engineering company that manufactures civil and military aero engines, marine propulsion systems, power generation equipment, and formerly luxury automobiles. Established in 2011, it is headquartered in London, and has 9 subsidiaries. It was formerly Rolls-Royce plc, and Rolls-Royce Group plc. In 2019 its revenue was £16.5 billion, with net income of £1.3 billion.
Rolls-Royce Limited — manufacturing company (aerospace and automobile designer and manufacturer). Established in 1904 in Manchester, it was later headquartered in Derby. It was nationalised in 1971 until 1987 when it was privatised as Rolls-Royce plc.
Rolls-Royce Motor Cars — manufacturing company (luxury automobiles). It is a subsidiary of BMW. Established in 1998, it is headquartered in Goodwood, West Sussex.
Rolls-Royce Motors — manufacturing company (luxury automobiles), 1973–1998. It was formerly part of Rolls-Royce Limited. It was acquired by Vickers in 1980, and sold to BMW in 1997.
Romulus Films — film production company from 1948, then medicine production from 2013. It was established in 1948.
Roxy Palace — online gambling company. Established in 2002, its headquarters is in London.
Royal Bank of Scotland (RBS) — financial services company (banking and insurance). Established in 1727, its headquarters is in Edinburgh, Scotland. In 1969, it merged with the National Commercial Bank of Scotland to form the National and Commercial Banking Group, which was later renamed the Royal Bank of Scotland Group and then NatWest Group. Its immediate parent company is NatWest Holdings, the "ring-fenced" business of NatWest Group. 
Royal Mail — British multinational postal service and courier company. Established in 1516 as a government department, its headquarters is in London.
Ruffels Pictures — film distribution company in the silent film era.

S
S Records - record label, see Syco Music
Sage Group plc — British multinational enterprise software company. Established in 1981, its headquarters is in Newcastle upon Tyne. In 2019 its revenue was £1.9 billion, with net income of £266 million.
Sainsbury's (J Sainsbury plc) — retailing company (supermarkets, convenience stores, banking, catalogue retailer (Argos), household furnishings retailer (Habitat)). Established in 1869, its headquarters is in Holborn, London. In 2019 its revenue was £29 billion, with net income of £219 million.
Sainsbury's Bank — financial services company (banking). Established in 1997, its headquarters are in Edinburgh, Scotland, and London. It was first established as a joint venture between J Sainsbury plc and Bank of Scotland, then in 2014 Sainsbury's took full ownership.
Saint John d'El Rey Mining Company — mining company (gold mining in Brazil), 1830–1985. Headquartered in London, for a period it used slave labour.
Salts Healthcare Ltd — manufacturing company (ostomy and orthotic products, formerly also surgeon's instruments and surgical appliances). Established in the 1700s in Wolverhampton, its headquarters is in Aston, Birmingham.
Samvo Group - gambling company, 2004–2017. It was headquartered in London.
Sands Films — film production company. Established in 1975, its headquarters is in London.
Sandscale Mining Company — mining company. Established in 1877, it is now defunct.
Santander UK plc — financial services company (banking and investment). Established in 2010, its headquarters is in Euston, London. It was formed by the merger of Abbey National with Bradford & Bingley and 3 months later with the Alliance & Leicester. Its parent company is Santander Group. In 2018 its revenue was £5.4 billion, with a net income of £1.3 billion.
Schroders — British multinational asset management company (previously also banking). Established in 1804, its headquarters is in London. In  2019 its revenue was £2.5 billion, with net income of £495 million.
Scott Cinemas — cinema chain company, headquartered in Newton Abbot, Devon.
Scott Free Productions — film and television production company. Established in 1970, its headquarters is in London. It was formerly known as Scott Free Enterprises,  and as Percy Main Productions.
Scottish Hydro Electric — energy company (electricity and gas generator and supplier), 1989–1998. Headquartered in Perth, Scotland, it was formed from the North of Scotland Hydro-Electric Board. It was acquired by SSE plc in 1998.
Scottish Mortgage Investment Trust — financial services company (investment management). Established in 1809, its headquarters is in Edinburgh, Scotland. It was formerly known as the Straits Mortgage and Trust Company. It is managed by Baillie Gifford & Co.
Scottish Nuclear — energy company (nuclear power generation), 1990–1996. It was formerly part of the South of Scotland Electricity Board. It became part of British Energy and Magnox Electric.
Scottish Power — energy company (electricity generation, supply and distribution). Established in 1990, its headquarters is in Glasgow, Scotland. It was formed mainly from the South of Scotland Electricity Board. Its parent company is Iberdrola.
Scottish Water — state owned utility company (water supply and sewage). Established in 2002, its headquarters is in Dunfermline, Scotland. It was formed by a merger of West of Scotland Water Authority, East of Scotland Water Authority, and North of Scotland Water Authority. It is owned by the Scottish Government.
See-Saw Films — film and television production company. Established in 2008, its headquarters is in London.
SEEBOARD — energy company (electricity supply), 1947–2002. It was formerly the South Eastern Electricity Board. In 2002 it became part of 24seven.
Segro plc — British multinational property and investment company (business space, industrial property). Established in 1920, its headquarters is in London. It was formerly known as Slough Trading Company Ltd, and as Slough Estates Ltd. In 2019 its revenue was £432 million, with net income of £860 million.
SES Water — utility company (water supply). Established in 1996, its headquarters is in Redhill, Surrey. Formerly known as Sutton and East Surrey Water, it was formed from the merger of East Surrey Water and Sutton District Water.
Seven Arts Pictures — film production company. Established in 2002, it was later liquidated. It was headquartered in London.
Seven Cars Limited — manufacturing company (automobiles). See Caterham Cars.
Seven Seas — manufacturing company (vitamins, minerals and health and fitness supplements). Established in 1935 in Hull, its headquarters is in Feltham, London. Formerly known as British Cod Liver Oil Producers (BCOL), it was acquired by Imperial Tobacco in 1974, Hanson Trust in 1986, Merck Group in 1996, and Procter & Gamble in 2019.
Severn Trent — utility company (water). Established in 1989, its headquarters is in Coventry. It was preceded by Severn Trent Water Authority. In 2019 its revenue was £1.7 billion, with net income of £315 million.
Severn Trent Water Authority — state owned utility company (water), 1974–1989. Headquartered in Birmingham, it was preceded by Derwent Valley Water Board, and succeeded by Severn Trent.
SGN — energy company (gas supplier). Established in 2005, its headquarters is in Horley. It was formerly known as Scotia Gas Networks.
Shakerley Collieries — mining company (coal), c1850s–1935. It became part of Manchester Collieries.
Sheffield Coal Company — mining company (coal) 1805–1961. It was headquartered in Sheffield, South Yorkshire. In 1937 it was acquired by United Steel Companies, then became part of the National Coal Board in 1947, and became defunct in 1961.
Sheffield Film Cooperative — film and radio production company. Established in 1975, its headquarters is in Sheffield.
Shepperton Studios — film studio. Established in 1931 at Shepperton, Surrey, it was first named Sound Film Producing and Recording Studios. It was also formerly known as Sound City. It is owned by the Pinewood Group.
Shine TV (UK) — Television production company. Established in 2001, its headquarters is in London.
Shire — pharmaceuticals company (drug development and production). Established in 1986 in Basingstoke, it moved its company registration to Ireland in 2008. It was acquired by Takeda Pharmaceutical Company in 2018.
SHS International — pharmaceuticals company (advanced medical nutrition products). Established in 1879 in Liverpool, it was formerly known as Powell & Scholefield. In 1990 it was acquired by Valio Oy, and then by Nutricia in 1995.
Sigma Films — film production company. Established in 1996, its headquarters is in Glasgow, Scotland.
Silver Vision — DVD and video distribution company. Owned by Clear Vision Ltd, it became defunct in 2014.
Siva Motor Car Company — manufacturing company (automobiles), 1970–1976. It was headquartered in Aylesbury.
Sirius Minerals — mining company (mining of minerals, fertiliser development), established in 2003. In March 2020 it was acquired by Anglo American plc.
Sky Betting & Gaming — gambling company (online and gaming). Established in 2002, its headquarters is in Leeds.
Smith & Nephew plc — multinational manufacturing company (medical equipment products for advanced wound management, arthroscopy, trauma and clinical therapy, and orthopedic reconstruction). Established in 1856, its headquarters is in Watford, Hertfordshire. In 2019, its revenue was £5.1 billion, with net income of £600 million.
Smith Electric Vehicles — manufacturing company (electric trucks, trams, milk floats, ice-cream floats, fork lifts, taxis etc.) 1920–2017. Originally headquartered in Washington, Tyne and Wear, its headquarters was moved to Kansas City, Missouri US. It was formerly known as Northern Coachbuilders (NCB).
Smiths Group plc — engineering company (detection sensors, mechanical seals, couplings, hydrodynamic bearings, filtration systems, medical devices, electric components, heating and ducting systems; previously timepieces, diamonds, automotive instrumentation and accessories, aerospace and marine instrumentation). Established in 1851, its headquarters is in London. It was formerly known as S. Smith & Sons, and as Smith Industries. In 2019 its revenue was £2.4 billion, with net income of £227 million.
Society of Mines Royal — mining company (metals, mining) 1568–c1750. It was probably merged with the Company of Mineral and Battery Works in 1669.
Solocrest — automobile and motorbike manufacturer, see Ariel Motor Company
Somerfield — retail company (groceries), 1875–2011. Headquartered in Bristol and then Manchester, it was previously known as J.H. Mills, and Gateway Supermarkets. In 1988 it acquired Kwik Save before selling the brand in 2006. In 2009 it was purchased by The Co-operative Group and continued as a brand name until 2011.
Somerset Film — film production and training company. Established in 1997, its headquarters is in Bridgwater, Somerset.
Sound City — film studio. See Shepperton Studios.
Sound Film Producing and Recording Studios - film studio. See Shepperton Studios.
South Essex Waterworks Company — utility company (water supply), 1861–1970. In 1970 it merged with the Southend Waterworks Company to form the Essex Water Company.
South East Water — utility company (water supply). Established in 1992, its headquarters is in Snodland, Kent.
South of Scotland Electricity Board (SSEB) — energy company (state owned electricity generator and supplier), 1954–1991. In 1955 it absorbed the South West Scotland Electricity Board, and the South East Scotland Electricity Board. It became part of Scottish Nuclear and Scottish Power.
South Staffordshire Water — utility company (water supply). Established in 1853, its headquarters is in Walsall, West Midlands. It was formerly known as the South Staffordhire Waterworks Company.
South West Water — utility company (water supply and sewage). Established in 1989, its headquarters is in Exeter, Devon. It was preceded by the South West Water Authority. Its parent company is the Pennon Group.
Southend Waterworks Company — utility company (water supply), 1871–1970. In 1970 it merged with the South Essex Waterworks Company to form the Essex Water Company.
Southern Electric — energy supplier (electricity), 1970–1998. Headquartered in Reading, Berkshire, it was formed from the Southern Electricity Board. It was succeeded by Scottish and Southern Energy.
Southern Water — utility company (water supply and sewage). Established in 1989, its headquarters is in Worthing, West Sussex. It was preceded by the Southern Water Authority. Its  parent company is Southern Water Capital.
Southwark and Vauxhall Waterworks Company — utility company (water), 1845–1903. Headquartered in London, it was formed from the merger of the Southwark, and Vauxhall water companies. It  became part of the Metropolitan Water Board.
Spark Energy — energy company (electricity and gas supplier, telecoms), 2007–2018. Headquartered in Selkirk, Scottish Borders, it has become part of OVO Energy.
Speakit Films — film production company, established in 2004.
Spirax-Sarco Engineering plc — manufacturing company (steam management systems, peristaltic pumps, and associated fluid path technologies). Established in 1888, its headquarters is in Cheltenham, Gloucestershire. It was formerly known as Sanders, Rehders & Co. (SARCO). In 2019 its revenue was £1.2 billion, with net income of £167 million.
Spirit Level Film — film production and distribution company, established in 2001.
Spin TV — television production company. Established in 2007, its headquarters is in Soho, London.
Sportech — gambling company (online gambling). Established in 2000, its headquarters is in London.
Spreadex — gambling company. Established in 1999 in Dunstable, its headquarters is in St Albans.
SSE plc — energy company (generator and supplier (electricity and gas), and telecoms networks). Established in 1998, its headquarters is in Perth, Scotland. It was formed from a merger of Scottish Hydro Electric and Southern Electric. It was formerly known as Scottish and Southern Energy. In 2019 its revenue was £7.3 billion, with net income of £1.4 billion.
SSL International — manufacturing company (healthcare products), 1999–2010. Headquartered in London, it was formed by the merger of Seton Scholl and LIG. In 2010 it was acquired by and folded into Reckitt Benckiser.
St. James's Place plc — financial services company (wealth management). Established in 1991, its headquarters is in Cirencester, Gloucestershire. It was formerly known as J Rothschild Assurance Group. In 2019 its revenue was £16.5 billion, with net income of £187 million.
Stallergenes Greer — multinational pharmaceuticals company (immunotherapy). Established in 2015, its headquarters is in London. It was formed by the merger of Stallergenes and US Greer Laboratories.
Standard Bank Limited — financial services company (multinational banking company mainly operating in Africa), 1862–1969. Headquartered in London, it was formerly known as Standard Bank of British South Africa. In 1969 it was merged with Chartered Bank of India, Australia and China to form Standard Chartered Bank.
Standard Chartered plc — British multinational financial services company (universal bank, consumer and commercial banking). Established in 1969, its headquarters is in London. It was formed from the merger of Chartered Bank of India, Australia and China with Standard Bank Limited. In 2019 its revenue was $15.4 billion, with net income of $2.3 billion.
Stanley Leisure — gambling company. Established in the 1950s, its headquarters is in Belfast.
Stanleybet International — gambling company. Established in 1997, its headquarters is in Liverpool.
Staveley Coal and Iron Company — coal mining, iron works, and chemicals company, 1863–1960. Headquartered in Staveley, Derbyshire, it was also known as Staveley Iron and Chemical Company. In 1960 it was acquired by Stewarts & Lloyds and merged with Stanton Ironworks to become Stanton and Staveley which was nationalised into the  British Steel Corporation in 1967.
Stephenson Clarke Shipping — shipping company (short sea bulk cargo), 1730–2012. Headquartered in Newcastle upon Tyne, it is the U.K.'s oldest shipping company.
Stevens Vehicles — manufacturing company (automobiles). Its headquarters is in Port Talbot, Wales.
Stolen Picture — film and television production company. Established in 2016, its headquarters is in London.
Stoll Pictures — film production and distribution company, established in 1918.
Strange Company — machinima production and distribution company, headquartered in Edinburgh, Scotland.
Stoll Film Studios — film studios. See Cricklewood Studios.
Suited Caribou Media — film post-production company. Established in 2013, its headquarters is in Glasgow, Scotland. It was formerly known as Mr Q Media.
Sutton District Water — utility company (water supply), 1863–1996. Headquartered in Sutton, London, it was formerly known as Sutton and Cheam Water Company. In 1996 it was merged with East Surrey Water Company to become Sutton and East Surrey Water.
SWEB Energy — energy supplier (electricity), 1990–2006. It was formed from the South Western Elecricity Board. In 1999 it was acquired by EDF Energy.
Swizzels Matlow - is a confectionery manufacturer branded as Swizzels. Established by brothers Maurice and Alfred Matlow in 1928 in London, it is now based in New Mills, Derbyshire. In 2019 its revenue was £78.6 million, with a net income of £10 million.
Syco — entertainment company (music publishing, talent agency, film and television production) Headquartered in London, it is also known as Syco Entertainment. Its subsidiary is Syco Music, a record label established in 2002 in London, that was formerly known as S Records.
Sylva Autokits — manufacturing company (kit cars). Established in 1981, its headquarters is in Lincolnshire.
Syncopy Inc. — film production company. Established in 2001, its headquarters is in London.
Sweetapple — marketing and public relations company. Established in 2002, its headquarters is in London.

T
Tanfield Group — automobile manufacturing company (electric vehicles, and specialist engineering). Established in 2003, its headquarters is in Tyne and Wear. It was formerly known as Comeleon.
Tarmac Group — multinational building materials and construction company (building materials, road construction, maintenance subcontractors, housebuilding), 1903–2013. Headquartered in Wolverhampton, West Midlands, it was formerly known as the Tar Macadam Syndicate. In 2013 it was merged with the UK assets of Lafarge to form Lafarge Tarmac which became Tarmac plc.
Tarmac plc — building materials company. Established in 2013, its headquarters is in Solihull. It was formed from the merger of Tarmac Group with the UK assets of Lafarge. It was formerly known as Lafarge Tarmac. Its parent company is CRH plc.
Tata Steel Europe — steel production company. Established in 1999, its headquarters is in London. It was formerly known as Corus Group which was formed by the merger of British Steel plc and Koninklijke Hoogovens. Its parent company is Tata Steel.
Taylor Wimpey plc — construction company (housebuilding). Established in 2007, its headquarters is in High Wycombe, Buckinghamshire. It was formed from the merger of Taylor Woodrow and George Wimpey. In 2019 its revenue was £4.3 billion, with net income of £673 million.
Taylor Woodrow — multinational construction company (housebuilding, civil and commercial construction), 1921–2007. Headquartered in London, in 2007 it was merged with George Wimpey to form Taylor Wimpey plc.
Tecrea — biotechnology company (nanomedicine). Established in 2012, its headquarters is in London.
Teddington Studios — film and television studios, 1910s—2014. It was located in London.
Telecom Plus — utility company (gas and electricity supply, landline and mobile telephony, and broadband). Established in 1996, its headquarters is in London. In 2019 its revenue was £804 million, with net income of £32 million.
Tempean Films — film and television production company. Established in 1948, its headquarters is in London.
Templeheart Films — film finance and production company, established in 2008.
Terra Firma Capital Partners — private equity company (with £4.7billion in assets). Established in 2002, its headquarters is in London. It was formerly part of Nomura Principal Finance Group.
Tesco Bank — financial services company (banking and insurance). Established in 1997, its headquarters is in Edinburgh, Scotland. It was formerly known as Tesco Personal Finance. Its parent company is Tesco plc.
Thames Water — utility company (water supply and sewage). Established in 1989, its headquarters is in Reading, Berkshire. It was formerly part of the Thames Water Authority and other publicly owned water companies. Its parent company is Kemble Water Holdings.
Theatre Workshop Scotland — theatre and film production company. Established in 1965, it is located in Edinburgh, Scotland. It was formerly known as Theatre Workshop Edinburgh.
Thin Man Films — film production company. Established in 1988, its headquarters is in London.
Thorn EMI Screen Entertainment — film production, and distribution company. See EMI Films.
Thornton & Ross — pharmaceuticals company (medicines, disinfectant, health treatments), 1922–2013. Headquartered in Linthwaite, West Yorkshire, in 2013 it was acquired by Stada Arzneimettel.
Tide — fintech business company (banking). Established in 2015, its headquarters is in London.
Tiger Racing — automobile manufacturing company  (kit cars). Established in 1989 in London, its headquarters is in Peterborough. It was formerly known as Tiger Cars.
Tigerlily Films — film and television production company, established in 2000.
Tigon British Film Productions (aka Tigon) — film production and distribution company. Established in 1966, its headquarters is in London.
Titanium Resources Group — holding company of mining, exploration and marketing companies in Sierra Leone.  Its headquarters were in London and Freetown,  Sierra Leone. It became Sierra Rutile Limited in 2011.
tombola — gaming company. Established in 1999, its headquarters is in Sunderland.
The Tote — gambling company. Established in 1928, its headquarters is in Wigan.
Tredegar Iron and Coal Company — iron works and coal mining company, 1797–1946. It was formerly known as Sirhowy Iroworks. In 1946 it was nationalised into the National Coal Board.
Triga Films — pornographic film production, est. 1997
Triking - automobile manufacturing company. Headquartered in  Hingham, Norfolk, it was formerly known as Triking Cyclecars.
TUI AG — Anglo-German multinational travel, hospitality, and tourism company (travel agencies, hotels, airlines, cruise ships, and retail stores). Established in 1923, its headquarters are in Hanover, and Berlin, Germany. It was originally known as the Prussian Mine and Foundry Company. Its 2019 revenue was £18.9 billion, with net income of £531 million.
TUI Airways — airline company. Established in 1962, its headquarters is in Luton, Bedfordshire. It was formerly known as Britannia Airways and also as Thomsonfly. Its parent company is TUI AG.
Tunnock's - Thomas Tunnocks Ltd. is a private limited confectionery company producing biscuits and cakes. Established in 1890, its headquarters is in Uddingston, Glasgow, Scotland.
TVF Media — film and television production company. Established in 1983, its headquarters is in London.
TVR — automobile manufacturing company (sports cars). Established in 1946 in Blackpool, its headquarters is in Walliswood, Surrey. It was formerly known as Trevcar Motors, TVR Engineering, and Layton Sports Cars. Its sister companies are Grantura Engineering, Grantura Plastics, and TVR Parts.
Twickenham Studios — film and television studios. Established in 1913, it is located in London.
Two Cities Films — film production company, established in 1937.
Tyldesley Coal Company — coal mining and brick works company, 1870–1947. Headquartered in Tyldesley, in 1947 it was nationalised into the National Coal Board.

U
UK Coal — was a coal mining, gas production, and renewable energy company from 1974 to 2015. Headquartered in Harworth, Nottinghamshire, it was formerly RJB Mining. It was succeeded by Harworth Group, a land and property company.
UK Power Networks — is an energy company (electricity distribution). Established in 2010, its headquarters is in London. It was formerly part of EDF Energy Works.
Ulster Bank Ltd — is a financial services company (banking and insurance). Established in 1836, its headquarters is in Belfast, Northern Ireland. It was formerly known as the Ulster Banking Company. Its parent company is NatWest Holdings, the "ring-fenced" business of NatWest Group.
Umbro — is a sports equipment manufacturer based in Manchester. Established in 1924, since 2012 is a subsidiary of Iconix Brand Group.
Underground Productions — is a film production company. See Modern Life?
United Biscuits - is a British multinational food manufacturer specialising in biscuits and other snackfood under brands such as McVitie's, Jacob's, Twiglets, and Carr's. It was established in 1948 by a merger of McVitie's & Price with MacFarlane Lang. Following a number of acquisitions and changes in ownership, in 2014 it was acquired by Yıldız Holding and is now a subsidiary of Pladis. Headquartered in London, its 2020 revenue was £867 million with a net income of £77 million.
United Steel Companies — was a steel making, engineering, and coal mining company from 1918 to 1967. It was nationalised in 1967.
United Utilities — is a utility company (water supply and sewage). Formerly it also supplied electricity. Established in 1995, its headquarters is in Warrington. It was founded by the merger of North West Water and NORWEB. Its 2019 revenue was £1.8 billion, with net income of £363 million.
Unusuality Productions — is a film production company. Established in 2005, its headquarters is in London.

V
Vandyke Productions — film production company, 1947–1956.
Vauxhall Motors — automobile manufacturing company (cars, commercial vehicles; tanks and military lorries during WWII). Established in 1857 at Vauxhall, London, its headquarters is in Chalton, Bedfordshire. It was formerly known as Alex Wilson & Company, and also as Vauxhall Iron Works. In 1925 it was bought by GM Motors, then sold to Groupe PSA in 2017.
Veolia Water Central — utility company (water supply), 1994–2012. Headquartered in Hatfield, Hertfordshire, it was formed as Three Valleys Water from the merger of the Colne Valley, Rickmansworth, and Lee Valley water companies. In 2012 it was merged into Affinity Water.
Veolia Water East — utility company (water supply), 1989–2012. Headquartered in Manningtree, it was formerly known as Tendring Hundred Water Services. In 2012 it was merged into Affinity Water.
Veolia Water Southeast — utility company (water supply), 1848–2012. Headquartered in Folkestone, Kent, it was formerly known as Folkestone & Dover Water Services. In 2012 it was merged into Affinity Water.
Verity Films — documentary film production company. Established in 1940, its headquarters is in London.
Vernalis plc — pharmaceuticals company (prescription drugs), 2003–2018. Headquartered in Winnersh, Berkshire, it was formerly British Biotech. In 2018 it was acquired by Ligand Pharmaceuticals.
Vertigo Films — film production and distribution company. Established in 2002, its headquarters is in London.
ViiV Healthcare — pharmaceuticals company (HIV drugs). Established in 2009, its headquarters is in Brentford. It is a subsidiary of GlaxoSmithKline (76.5%), Pfizer (13.5%), and Shionogi (10%).
Vince & Son — transport manufacturing company (coachbuilders, motor buses, ex-government vehicles). Established in 1868, its headquarters is in Ely, Cambridgeshire.
Virgin Group — British multinational venture capital conglomerate. Founded in 1970, its headquarters is in London.
Virgin Cinemas — cinema chain company, 1995–2002.
Virgin Films — film production and distribution company, 1979–1986.
Virgin Games — online gambling company, established in 2003.
Virgin Media — telecommunications and mass-media company (digital television, broadband internet, fixed line telephony, mobile telephony). Established in 2006, its headquarters is in Hook, Hampshire. It was formerly known as NTL-Telewest.  Since 2013 it is a subsidiary of Liberty Global.
Virgin Money UK plc — financial services holding company of Clydesdale Bank plc which trades as Clydesdale Bank, Yorkshire Bank, and Virgin Money. It was formerly known as CYBG plc. Its 2019 revenue was £1.7 billion, with net income of £194 million.
Viridor — waste management, recycling and renewable energy company. Established in 1956, its headquarters is in Taunton, Somerset. It was formerly known as Harrison Western, and also as Haul Waste. Its parent company is Pennon Group.
Vodafone Group — British multinational telecommunications company (including fixed line telephone, mobile phone, broadband, digital television, internet television, and IPTV). Established in 1991, it has headquarters in London and Newbury, Berkshire. It has 1 division (Vodafone Global Enterprise) and 41 subsidiaries. Its predecessors were Racal Telecom, and Racal Vodafone Holdings, with the Vodafone brand introduced in 1985. Vodafone Group has also traded as Vodafone Airtouch. Its 2019 revenue was €43.6 billion, with net income of –€7.6 billion.
Vue Cinemas — cinema chain company. Established in 2003, its headquarters is in Chiswick, London.

W
Wales & West Utilities — is an energy company (gas supplier). Established in 2005, its headquarters is in Newport, Wales. It was formerly part of National Grid plc. It is owned by CK Infrastructure Holdings.
Walkers - is a snack food manufacturer whose products include crisps and other savoury snacks. It was founded in 1948 in Leicester by Henry Walker. In 1989 Walkers was acquired by Frito-Lay, a division of PepsiCo.
Walkers Shortbread - is a Scottish manufacturing company that mainly produces biscuits such as shortbread, cookies, and crackers. It was founded in 1898 in Torphins, Scotland by Joseph Walker. Still owned and managed by the Walker family, its headquarters is in Aberlour, Scotland.
Walthamstow Studios — was a film studios company from 1914 to 1930. Its headquarters was in Walthamstow, London.
Walturdaw Company Limited — was a film production, distribution, and film equipment company from 1901/4 to 1925. Its headquarters was in London.
Warburtons – is a private baking company that is the best selling bakery brand in the United Kingdom. It was established in 1876 by Thomas Warburton and is headquartered in Bolton, Greater Manchester.
Warp Films — is a film and TV production company. Established in 2001, its headquarters are in  Sheffield and London. See also Warp X.
Warp Records — is a record label. Established in 1989, its headquarters was in Sheffield, and then London.
Warp X — is a film production company (sister company of Warp Films). Established in 2005, its headquarters was in Sheffield, then Notts, and  then London.
Warwick Films — film productioncompany, 1951–1962. Its headquarters was in London.
Warwick Trading Company — film production and distribution company, 1898–1915. Its headquarters was in London.
Water Plus — water retail company (water supply and sewage for businesses). Established in 2016, its headquarters is in Stoke-on-Trent. It is a joint venture between United Utilities and Severn Trent Water.
Well Pharmacy — retail and pharmaceutical company (retail, pharmaceuticals, healthcare, and beauty products). Established in 1945, its headquarters is in Manchester. It was formerly The Co-operative Pharmacy, part of The Co-operative Group until, in 2014, it was sold to the Bestway Group.
Welsh-Pearson — film production and distribution company. Established in 1918, its headquarters is in London.
Welsh Water — non-profit utility company (water supply and sewage). Previously it was also an electricity supplier under the name Hyder. Established in 1989, its headquarters is in Nelson, Wales. It was preceded by the Welsh Water Authority. Its parent company is Glas Cymru.
Welsh National Water Development Authority — state owned utility company (water supply and sewage), 1973–1989. It was later known as the Welsh Water Authority. It was succeeded by Welsh Water.
Welwyn Studios — film studio company, 1928–1950. It was located in Welwyn Garden City, Hertfordshire.
Wessex Water — utility company (water supply and sewage). Established in 1973, its headquarters is in Bath, Somerset. It was formerly known as the Wessex Water Authority. Its parent company is YTL Corporation.
West Middlesex Waterworks Company — utility company (water), 1806–1903. Headquartered in London, it became part of the Metropolitan Water Board.
Westbourne Communications — public relations company.
Western Power Distribution — energy company (electricity distribution). Established in 1999, its headquarters is in Bristol. It is composed of 3 companies - WPD South West, WPD South Wales, and WPD Midlands. Its parent company is PPL.
Westfield Sportscars — automobile manufacturing company (sports cars). Established in 1982, its headquarters is in Kingswinford, West Midlands.
Whitbread — multinational hotel and restaurant company. It was formerly a brewery company and owner of an estate of licensed public houses. Established in 1742, its headquarters is in Houghton Regis, Bedfordshire. It was formerly known as the Hind Brewery. In 2019 its revenue was £2 billion, with net income of £3.7 billion.
White Crane Films, film production company. Established in 1990, its headquarters is in London.
Wigan Coal and Iron Company — coal mining, and iron works company. Established in 1865, it has become defunct.  
William Hill — gambling company. Established in 1934, its headquarters is in London. In 2019 its revenue was £1.58 billion, with net income of £27 million.
Williams & Glyn's Bank — financial services company (banking and insurance), 1970–1985. Headquartered in London, it was formed by the merger of Williams Deacon & Co with Glyn, Mills & Co. Its parent company was the National and Commercial Banking Group, which was later renamed Royal Bank of Scotland Group (now NatWest Group).
Windsor Studios — film studios company. See Catford Studios.
Wimbledon Studios — film and television studios  company. Formerly known as Merton Studios, it is located in Colliers Wood, London. 
Woodfall Film Productions — film production company. Established in 1958, its headquarters is in London.
Working Title Films — film and television production company. Established in 1984, its headquarters is in London. Its subsidiaries are: WT2 Productions (film production); and WTTV (TV productions).
World Wide Pictures (UK) — film, television, and multimedia production company. Established in 1935, its headquarters is in London.
WPP plc — communications, advertising, and public relations company. Established in 1971, its headquarters is in London. In 2019 its revenue was £13.2 billion, with net income of £707 million.
WRc — research consultancy company (water, waste and the environment). Established in 1927 it was formerly known as the Water Pollution Research Board (WPRB), the Water Pollution Research Laboratory (WPRL), and the Water Research Centre.
Wrexham Water plc — utility company (water supply), 1863–1997. It was formerly known as Wrexham Waterworks Company, and as the Wrexham and East Denbighshire Water Company.  in 1997 it became part of Dee Valley Water.

X
Xchanging — technology company. Established in 1999, its headquarters is in London. 
Xtract Resources — metals, minerals, and mining company. Established in 2004, its headquarters is in London. It was previously known as Resmex, and as Xtract Energy.

Y
Yeast Culture — film and TV production company. Established in 1999, its headquarters is in Camden, London.
Yorkshire Electricity — energy company (electricity supply and distribution), 1948–1997. Its headquarters was in Leeds, Yorkshire. It was formerly the Yorkshire Electricity Board. In 1997 it was acquired by American Electric Power and Public Service Company of Colorado.
Yorkshire Water — utility company (water supply and sewage). Established in 1973, its headquarters is in Bradford, Yorkshire. It was formerly known as the Yorkshire Water Authority. Its parent company is the Kelda Group.

Z
Zeneca — British multinational pharmaceutical company (oncology and heart drugs), 1993–1999. Its headquarters was in London. It was formerly part of Imperial Chemical Industries (ICI). In 1999 it merged with Astra AB to form AstraZeneca.
Zenith Productions — film and TV production company, 1984–2005. It was later known as Zenith Entertainment.
Zenos Cars — automobile manufacturing company (sports cars). Established in 2012, its headquarters is in Wymondham, Norfolk.
Zipline Creative — film, TV, and radio production company. Established in 2008, its headquarters is in Risca, South Wales.

References